

Winners and nominees

2000s

2010s

Records  
 Most awarded series: María de todos los Ángeles, 2 times.
 Most awarded series (ever winner): María de todos los Ángeles, 2 times.
 Most nominated series: El Pantera and Los simuladores with 3 nominations.
 Most nominated series without a win: Los simuladores with 3 nominations.
 Series winning after short time: María de todos los Ángeles (2010 and 2014), 4 years difference.

References

External links 
TVyNovelas at esmas.com
TVyNovelas Awards at the univision.com

Series
Series
Series